Licania longicuspidata is a species of plant in the family Chrysobalanaceae. It is endemic to Ecuador.  Its natural habitats are subtropical or tropical moist lowland forests and subtropical or tropical moist montane forests.

References

Endemic flora of Ecuador
longicuspidata
Endangered plants
Taxonomy articles created by Polbot
Taxobox binomials not recognized by IUCN